Gennady Tatarinov (born 20 April 1991, in Kopeysk) is a Russian cyclist who last rode for RusVelo.

Major results
2009
2nd Giro della Lunigiana
2nd Overall 3 Giorni Orobica
1st Stage 1

2012
1st stages 1 (TTT) and 4 Tour d'Azerbaïdjan
7th Tour de l'Avenir
2013
3rd National U23 Road Race Championships

References

1991 births
Living people
Russian male cyclists
People from Kopeysk
Sportspeople from Chelyabinsk Oblast